Kasia Gruchalla-Wesierski (born March 31, 1991) is a Canadian rower. Gruchalla-Wesierski's hometown is Calgary, Alberta.

Career
Gruchalla-Wesierski was originally an alpine skier, however a broken leg injury resulted in her switching to rowing. Gruchalla-Wesierski made her national team debut in 2018.

In 2019, Gruchalla-Wesierski was part of the eights boat, finishing in fourth at the World Championships and qualifying Canada the boat for the 2020 Summer Olympics.

In June 2021, Gruchalla-Wesierski was named to Canada's 2020 Olympic team in the women's eights boat. At the Olympics, the boat won the gold medal, Canada's first in the event since 1992.

References

External links

Canadian female rowers
Living people
Anglophone Quebec people
Rowers from Montreal
Skiers from Calgary
Skiers from Montreal
Canadian female alpine skiers
1991 births
Rowers at the 2020 Summer Olympics
Medalists at the 2020 Summer Olympics
Olympic medalists in rowing
Olympic gold medalists for Canada
21st-century Canadian women
World Rowing Championships medalists for Canada